Lasha Khutsishvili (born 2 September 1985 in Tbilisi) is a Georgian politician who has been Minister of Finance of Georgia since 1 April 2021.

Education
He was educated at the European High School of Management-Tbilisi (Bachelor's degree in Business Administration) and Preston University (Bachelor of Arts in General Management).

Career
 February 2014-April 2021 - Deputy Minister of Finance of Georgia
 July 2016-September 2020 - Elected Member of the Steering Group of the OECD/G20 Inclusive Framework on BEPS (Base erosion and profit shifting)
 January 2013-February 2014 - Director General, Georgia Revenue Service
 January 2008-2013 - Ernst & Young LLC Tbilisi Office, Tax & Legal
 2007-2008 - Member, The Council of Tax Resolution, Ministry of Finance of Georgia

External links
 Site of Government of Georgia

References 

1985 births
Living people
Finance ministers of Georgia
Government ministers of Georgia (country)
21st-century politicians from Georgia (country)